Azharuddin Mallick (born 11 July 1997) is an Indian footballer who plays as a forward for Mohammedan in the I-League.

Career

United Sports Club
Azharuddin made his debut for United S.C. as a young striker. He played for their under 19 team and showed his talent when United Sports Club's under 19 team defeated Pune F.C. under 19 team to reach IFA shield final.

Mohun Bagan
He made his debut for Mohun Bagan A.C. during Calcutta Football League 2015 (also known as KFL or Kolkata Football League). He got his first goal wearing Mohun Bagan's jersey against Kalighat M.S.

Mohammedan
On 8 February 2021, Mallick was roped in by Mohammedan along with Nigerian striker John Chidi. On 14 January 2021, he made his debut for the club, against Indian Arrows in a 1–0 loss, coming on as an 85th-minute substitute.

He scored his first goal for the club, on 10 March 2021, against RoundGlass Punjab, in a thrilling 3–3 draw.

Career statistics

Club

Honours
Mohun Bagan
Calcutta Football League: 2018–19
Mohammedan Sporting
I-League: 2021–22

References

Living people
Association football forwards
Indian footballers
I-League players
Footballers from West Bengal
Mohun Bagan AC players
1997 births
United SC players
FC Bengaluru United players
I-League 2nd Division players
Mohammedan SC (Kolkata) players
Calcutta Football League players